E3 ubiquitin-protein ligase LRSAM1, previously known as Tsg101-associated ligase (Tal), is an enzyme that in humans is encoded by the LRSAM1 gene.

Clinical significance 

Mutations in LRSAM1 have been reported in the peripheral neuropathy Charcot-Marie-Tooth type 2P (OMIM 614436), while disruption of the mouse Lrsam1 gene has been shown to sensitize peripheral axons to acrylamide-induced degeneration.

Interactions 

LRSAM1 has been shown to interact with TSG101.

References

Further reading 

EC 6.3.2